Raikou is an Electric-type Pokémon in the Pokémon franchise.

Raikou may also refer to:

Raikou (雷公), also known as Raijin (雷神), Kaminari-sama (雷様), Raiden-sama (雷電様), Narukami (鳴る神),  a god of lightning, thunder and storms in Japanese mythology and the Shinto religion
Raikou Minamoto, a character in the Tactics (タクティクス, Takutikusu) Japanese manga series
Minamoto no Raikou, aka Minamoto no Yorimitsu (源 頼光, 948 – August 29, 1021), a Japanese historical figure who served the regents of the Fujiwara clan